Prince Frederick William II of Nassau-Siegen (11 November 1706 – 2 March 1734), official titles: Fürst zu Nassau, Graf zu Katzenelnbogen, Vianden, Diez, Limburg und Bronkhorst, Herr zu Beilstein, Stirum, Wisch, Borculo, Lichtenvoorde und Wildenborch, Erbbannerherr des Herzogtums Geldern und der Grafschaft Zutphen, was since 1722 Fürst of Nassau-Siegen, a part of the County of Nassau. He descended from the House of Nassau-Siegen, a cadet branch of the Ottonian Line of the House of Nassau. He was the last male representative of his lineage, with him the Protestant line of the House of Nassau-Siegen became extinct.

Biography

He was baptised in Siegen on 18 November. His mother died just one year after his birth.

In October 1712, Frederick William Adolf and William Hyacinth, the Catholic Fürst of Nassau-Siegen, reached an agreement about their share in the city of Siegen. William Hyacinth ceded the Catholic land to Frederick William Adolf in exchange for an annual pension of 12,000 Reichsthalers. There was even an intention to marry off Frederick William, the Reformed Hereditary Prince, to Maria Anna Josepha, William Hyacinth’s underage daughter. All this was done not in the least to get rid of the troublesome foreign administration. Since April 1707, the Catholic part of the Principality of Nassau-Siegen had, by order of the Aulic Council, been under the administration of the cathedral chapter in Cologne because of the maladministration of William Hyacinth.

On the death of his father in 1722, Frederick William succeeded his father as the territorial lord of the Protestant part of the principality of Nassau-Siegen and co-ruler of the city of Siegen. He possessed the district of Siegen (with the exception of seven villages) and the districts of Hilchenbach and Freudenberg. He shared the city of Siegen with his second cousin, William Hyacinth, the Catholic Fürst of Nassau-Siegen. Finally, Frederick William succeeded his father in a part of the Principality of Nassau-Hadamar. Due to he was still a minor, he was under the guardianship and regency of his stepmother Amalie Louise of Courland until 1727.

Frederick William became a ritmeester in the Dutch States Army on 23 November 1723, and colonel of a regiment infantry on 22 July 1728. And in 1731 he became a knight of the Order of Saint John (Bailiwick of Brandenburg, Saxony, Pomerania and Wendland) in Sonnenburg.

Frederick William died in the Nassauischer Hof in Siegen on 2 March 1734, he was only 27 years old. He was buried on 17 April in the  there.

On 19 June, his widow Sophie Polyxena Concordia of Sayn-Wittgenstein-Hohenstein gave birth to the fifth daughter. Thus, there were no male heirs and the Dowager Fürstin was compelled to accept that the Catholic Fürst William Hyacinth would take possession of the Reformed lands and the city of Siegen. However, the Fürsten Christian of Nassau-Dillenburg and William Charles Henry Friso of Nassau-Diez also laid claim to the inheritance. Their soldiers occupied the Nassauischer Hof in Siegen, while William Hyacinth was in Spain.

In order to drive out this occupation by Nassau-Dillenburg and Nassau-Diez, Elector Clemens August of Cologne called in the Landesausschuß in his countries bordering the Siegerland. On 20 August 1735, peasants from Cologne crossed the borders of the Principality of Nassau-Siegen and plundered ‘was ihnen vorkam’ (‘what was in front of them’). On 23 August they were admitted to the (Catholic) castle and advanced with two to three thousand men to the (Reformed) Nassauischer Hof. But the armies of Nassau-Dillenburg and Nassau-Diez, united with the citizens of Siegen, forced the troops from Cologne to flee. Thus, the Reformed part of Siegerland remained under the rule of Nassau-Dillenburg and Nassau-Diez, and the Catholic part remained under the imperial administration.

When, during the renovation of the Fürstengruft in 1951, the marble slabs that had been placed in front of the niches in 1893 had to be reattached, it was possible to take a look inside the graves. It was discovered that many graves had already been opened. Behind the slabs were walls of field-baked bricks, some of which were loose and allowed a view into the interior of the niches. In the light of a strong flashlight one could see that in the niche of Frederick William is a coffin apparently made of mahogany, framed by gilt bands about 4 cm wide.

Marriage and issue

Frederick William married at Ludwigseck Hunting Lodge near  on 23 September 1728 to Countess Sophie Polyxena Concordia of Sayn-Wittgenstein-Hohenstein (Berlin, 28 May 1709 – , Siegen, 15 December 1781), the second daughter of Count August of Sayn-Wittgenstein-Hohenstein and his first wife Countess Concordia of Sayn-Wittgenstein-Hohenstein.

From the marriage of Frederick William and Sophie Polyxena Concordia the following children were born:
 Charlotte Sophia Louise (Siegen, 6 June 1729 – Burgsteinfurt, 2 April 1759), married in Siegen on 30 September 1748 to Count Charles Peter Ernest of Bentheim-Steinfurt (Burgsteinfurt, 30 August 1729 – Burgsteinfurt, 30 June 1780).
 Frederica Wilhelmine Polyxena (Nassauischer Hof, Siegen, 3 April 1730 – Wittgenstein Castle, Laasphe, 18 November 1733).
 Mary Eleonore Concordia (Siegen, 2 March 1731 – Kamen, 20 April 1759). She died of smallpox in the house of the preacher Theodore Diederich Henrich Wever in Kamen.
 Frederica Augusta Sophia (Nassauischer Hof, Siegen, 1 June 1732 – Nassauischer Hof, Siegen, 23 March 1733).
 Anne Charlotte Augusta (Nassauischer Hof, Siegen, 19 June 1734 – Untere Schloss, Siegen, 9 June 1759).

Ancestors

Notes

References

Sources
 
 
 
 
 
 
 
 
 
 
 
 
  (2004). "Die Fürstengruft zu Siegen und die darin von 1669 bis 1781 erfolgten Beisetzungen". In:  u.a. (Redaktion), Siegener Beiträge. Jahrbuch für regionale Geschichte (in German). Vol. 9. Siegen: Geschichtswerkstatt Siegen – Arbeitskreis für Regionalgeschichte e.V. p. 183–202.
 
  (1882). Het vorstenhuis Oranje-Nassau. Van de vroegste tijden tot heden (in Dutch). Leiden: A.W. Sijthoff/Utrecht: J.L. Beijers.

External links

 Nassau. In: Medieval Lands. A prosopography of medieval European noble and royal families, compiled by Charles Cawley.
 Nassau Part 5. In: An Online Gotha, by Paul Theroff.

|-

1706 births
1734 deaths
German Calvinist and Reformed Christians
German military officers
Frederick William 02 of Nassau-Siegen
Order of Saint John (Bailiwick of Brandenburg)
Frederick William 02 of Nassau-Siegen
People from Siegen
18th-century German people
Military personnel from North Rhine-Westphalia